"Chainsaw" is a song recorded by American singer Nick Jonas from his third studio album, Last Year Was Complicated. It was released on May 13, 2016, by Island, Safehouse and Republic Records as the album's second Promotional single. The song was written by Nick Jonas, Simon Wilcox, Sean Douglas, Julia Michaels and Nolan Lambroza.

Background
On March 24, 2016, Jonas announced the song as part of the track list for his new album. He said that the song is one of his most vulnerable songs of the album and that it is inspired by his breakup with Olivia Culpo. He also said that "Chainsaw" is the most personal song he has ever written.

Music video
A teaser of the music video was released online on May 9, 2016 In the video Victoria's Secret and Portuguese model Sara Sampaio make an appearance.
The video was released on May 13, 2016 and is directed by Luke Monaghan. In the clip the singer wanders around an empty home reminiscing about a former girlfriend and all the memories they shared together before burning it down.

Live performance
During the taping of CMT Crossroads he performed the song and "Close" with Thomas Rhett and Danielle Bradbery.
The song is part of the setlist of the Future Now Tour.

Track listing
Digital download – remixes
"Chainsaw"  – 3:36

Charts

Release history

References

2016 singles
2016 songs
Nick Jonas songs
Songs written by Sean Douglas (songwriter)
Island Records singles
Songs written by Simon Wilcox
Songs written by Sir Nolan
Songs written by Nick Jonas
Songs written by Julia Michaels